A Lady to Love is a 1930 American pre-Code drama film directed by Victor Sjöström and written by Sidney Howard. It stars Vilma Bánky, Edward G. Robinson, Robert Ames, Richard Carle and Lloyd Ingraham. The film was released on February 28, 1930, by Metro-Goldwyn-Mayer. Bánky and Robinson appeared in German-language version also produced and directed by Sjöström. Otherwise with a different cast, it was released a year later in the United States as Die Sehnsucht Jeder Frau.

Plot
Tony, a prosperous Italian vineyardist in California, advertises for a young wife, passing off a photograph of his handsome hired man, Buck, as himself. Lena, a San Francisco waitress, takes up the offer, and though she is disillusioned upon discovering the truth, she goes through with the marriage because of her desire to have a home and partially because of her weakness for Buck, whose efforts to take her away from Tony confirm her love for her husband.

Cast 
Vilma Bánky as Lena Shultz
Edward G. Robinson as Tony
Robert Ames as Buck	
Richard Carle as Postman 
Lloyd Ingraham as Father McKee
Anderson Lawler as Doctor
Gum Chin as Ab Gee
Henry Armetta as Angelo
George Davis as Giorgio

Reception
Mordaunt Hall in The New York Times praised Robinson but finds the rest lacking: "The picture lacks a pictorial mobility, but its range of acting, as offered by Mr. Robinson, from the lightest humor of emotions, as depicted during the scene when he discovers himself forsaken by his loved ones, is most gratifying."

Copyright status
In 1958, the film entered the public domain (in the USA) because the claimants did not renew its copyright registration in the 28th year after publication.

See also
The Secret Hour (1928)
They Knew What They Wanted (1940)

References

External links 
 
 
 

1930 films
1930s English-language films
American black-and-white films
American drama films
1930 drama films
Metro-Goldwyn-Mayer films
Films directed by Victor Sjöström
Remakes of American films
Sound film remakes of silent films
1930s American films